The 2014 Westminster City Council election took place on 22 May 2014 to elect members of Westminster City Council in England. This was on the same day as other local elections.

Overall results
The Conservatives retained control of the council, winning 44 seats (-4). Labour won 16 seats (+4), gaining all 3 seats in Churchill ward and 1 in Maida Vale from the Conservatives.

|}

Ward results
The percentage of vote share and majority are based on the average for each party's votes in each ward. The raw majority number is the margin of votes between the lowest-placed winning party candidate and the opposition party's highest-placed losing candidate. Starred candidates are the incumbents.

Abbey Road

Bayswater

Bryanston and Dorset Square

Church Street

Churchill

In July 2017, Murad Gassanly defected from Labour to the Conservative Party. This meant he sat as a Conservative councillor.

Harrow Road

Hyde Park

Results are compared with the 2010 election, not the 2012 by-election.

Knightsbridge and Belgravia

Lancaster Gate

Little Venice

Maida Vale

Marylebone High Street

Results are compared with the 2010 election, not the 2013 by-election.

Queen's Park

Regent's Park

St James's

Tachbrook

Vincent Square

Warwick

West End

Westbourne

Queen's Park Community Council
Although not a ward for Westminster City Council, electors went to the polls for the newly-established Queen's Park Community Council with both votes cast and results counted at the same time as the other council wards.  The Community Council is non party-political with all candidates standing as ‘independents’. Three candidates were elected to each of wards QPA and QPB and three returned unopposed for each of QPC and QPD.

QPA

QPB

QPC

QPD

2014-2018 by-elections 

The by-election was called following the resignation of Cllr Edward Argar.

The by-election was called following the resignation of Cllr. Nilavra Mukerji.

The by-election was called following the death of Cllr. Audrey R. Lewis.

The by-election was called following the resignation of Cllr. Vincenzo Rampulla.

References

Notes

Westminster
Council,2014
Election, 2014
Westminster City Council election
2010s in the City of Westminster